Ramiro Ortiz Mayorga is a Nicaraguan businessman. He heads Grupo Promérica, one of the main corporate groups of Nicaragua. Considered one the wealthiest men of Nicaragua. He owns Banco de la Producción. He is the former owner of  El Nuevo Diario newspaper. He is also a member of Washington D.C. based think tank the Inter-American Dialogue.

References

Nicaraguan businesspeople
Year of birth missing (living people)
Living people
Members of the Inter-American Dialogue